Murdock MacQuarrie (August 25, 1878 – August 20, 1942) was an American silent film actor and director. His name was also seen as Murdock McQuarrie.

MacQuarrie was born in San Francisco, California, and attended school there. He was the brother of actors Albert MacQuarrie, Frank MacQuarrie, and George MacQuarrie.

After acting on stage, MacQuarrie began acting in films in 1902 with Biograph. His film work included The Count of Monte Cristo (1913), before becoming a director at Universal. He is perhaps best-remembered by modern audiences as J. Widdecombe Billows, the eccentric inventor of the eating machine, in Charlie Chaplin's Modern Times (1936).

In the 1910s, MacQuarrie directed at Universal, and in the early 1920s he returned to acting.

He diversified his activities in 1919, joining his wife in her real-estate business in Hollywood.

On August 20, 1942, MacQuarrie died in Los Angeles, California, aged 63.

Filmography

Actor

1910s
 The Hand of Mystery (1912, Short)
 The Ways of Fate (1913, Short)
 The Scarlet Letter (1913, Short) .... Roger Chillingworth
 Mission Bells (1913, Short)
 Mother (1913, Short)
 The Trap (1913, Short) .... Chance
 The Echo of a Song (1913, Short) .... A modern fagin
 Criminals (1913, Short) .... Richard Wainwright / John Dick
 The Thumb Print (1913, Short) .... The Cook (credited as Malcolm J. MacQuarrie)
 When Death United (1913, Short) .... (credited as Malcolm MacQuarrie)
 The Count of Monte Cristo (1913) .... Danglars
 The Boob's Dream Girl (1913, Short) .... Count Alberti (credited as Malcolm MacQuarrie)
 Red Margaret, Moonshiner (1913, Short) .... Government Agent
 Bloodhounds of the North (1913, Short) .... Mountie
 The Lie (1914, Short) .... Auld MacGregor
 The Honor of the Mounted (1914, Short) .... Mountie
 Remember Mary Magdalen (1914, Short) .... The Minister
 Discord and Harmony (1914, Short) .... The Composer
 The Menace to Carlotta (1914, Short) .... Tony's Father
 The Embezzler (1914, Short) .... John Spencer
 The Lamb, the Woman, the Wolf (1914, Short) .... The Lamb
 The End of the Feud (1914, Short) .... Hen Dawson
 The Tragedy of Whispering Creek (1914, Short) .... The Stranger
 The Unlawful Trade (1914, Short) .... The Revenue Man
 Heart Strings (1914, Short)
 The Forbidden Room (1914, Short) .... Dr. Gibson
 The Old Cobbler (1914, Short) .... The Cobbler
 The Hopes of Blind Alley (1914, Short) .... Jean Basse
 A Ranch Romance (1914, Short) .... Jack Deering
 Her Grave Mistake (1914, Short) .... Roger Grant
 By the Sun's Rays (1914, Short) .... John Murdock
 The Oubliette (1914, Short) .... François Villon
 A Miner's Romance (1914, Short) .... Bob Jenkins
 The Higher Law (1914, Short) .... François Villon
 Be Neutral (1914, Short)
 Richelieu (1914) .... Cardinal Richelieu
 The Old Bell-Ringer (1914, Short) .... Thomas Drake - the Old Organist
 Monsieur Bluebeard (1914, Short) .... François Villon
 The Nihilists (1914, Short) .... Thomas Madison - Prosecuting Attorney
 The Wall of Flame (1914, Short) .... Old Fenton - the Father
 The Star Gazer (1914, Short) .... The Old Astronomer
 Two Thieves (1914, Short) .... The Burglar
 Ninety Black Boxes (1914, Short) .... François Villon
 As We Journey Through Life (1914, Short) .... Old Uncle Eli
 The Foundlings of Father Time (1914, Short) .... Daddy Ross - the Aged Husband
 The Widow's Last (1914, Short) .... The Old Shoemaker
 The Christmas Spirit (1914, Short) .... Harry the Hobo
 For I Have Toiled (1914, Short) .... Hiram Marshall
 When It's One of Your Own (1914, Short) .... Heinrich Gerhardt
 His Last Performance (1915, Short) .... Old Doc Jackson
 The Clutch of the Emperor (1915, Short)
 The Useless One (1915, Short)
 A Small Town Girl (1915, Short) .... The Snob's Father
 The Dear Old Hypocrite (1915, Short) .... Wealthy Uncle George
 Alias Mr. Smith (1915, Short) .... Frank Wilson alias Mr. Smith
 Seven and Seventy (1915, Short) .... Captain John Brent
 Dad (1915, Short) .... Dad
 An Example (1915, Short) .... Ex-Sheriff Joseph Bohn
 The Prayer of a Horse or: His Life Story Told by Himself (1915, Short) .... Tom Collins
 Wheels Within Wheels (1915, Short) .... Von Ludwig
 The Truth About Dan Deering (1915, Short) .... Dan Deering
 At His Own Terms (1915, Short) .... John Marsh - Backwoodsman
 Number 239 (1915, Short) .... John Anders
 The Cameo Ring (1915, Short) .... John Brown
 Putting One Over (1915, Short) .... Bad Louis
 The Old Tutor (1915, Short) .... The Old Tutor
 The Troubadour (1915, Short) .... Joe Trinidad - the Troubadour
 The Fear Within (1915, Short) .... Brother Gregoire
 The Faith of Her Fathers (1915, Short) .... Rabbi Tamor
 The Stronger Mind (1915, Short) .... A Crook
 Where Brains Are Needed (1915, Short) .... Old Tom Sharpleigh - the Detective
 The Old Doctor (1915, Short) .... Old Doctor Jones
 The Swinging Doors (1915, Short) .... Jean Dumont
 In His Mind's Eye (1915, Short) .... Peter von Helm - Blind Beggar
 The Tinker of Stubbenville (1915, Short) .... Will Harvey - the Tinkerof Stubbinville
 The Old Grouch (1915, Short) .... John Agnew
 The Closing Chapter (1915, Short) .... Hamilton Walker - the Grandfather
 Mein Friendt Schneider (1915, Short) .... David Hoffman - the Pawnbroker (as Murdock McQuarrie)
 His Beloved Violin (1915, Short) .... Von Wagner
 Ethel's Burglar (1915, Short) .... Norton - the Burglar
 The Mystery of the Tapestry Room (1915, Short) .... Tom Sharpleigh - Detective
 The Tam o' Shanter (1915, Short) .... Tam O' Shanter
 The Finest Gold (1915, Short) .... Scrooge McQuoil
 The Sheriff of Red Rock Gulch (1915, Short) .... Bill Borden
 The $50,000 Jewel Theft (1915, Short) .... Detective Tom Sparks (as M.J. MacQuarrie)
 The Flag of Fortune (1915, Short) .... Grandpa
 The Trap That Failed (1915, Short) .... Frank Harwood
 The Sacrifice of Jonathan Gray (1915, Short) .... Jonathan Gray
 Colonel Steel, Master Gambler (1915, Short) .... Colonel Steele
 Babbling Tongues (1915, Short) .... Martin Lowe
 X-3 (1916, Short) .... Henshaw
 The Fatal Introduction (1916, Short) .... Jim Claverling
 On Dangerous Ground (1916, Short) .... Louis Goldenberg
 The Stain in the Blood (1916) .... Bill Jenkins (as Murdock J. MacQuarrie)
 Nancy's Birthright (1916) .... John Martingale
 The Narrow Creed (1916, Short) .... Dr. Hendricks
 Life's Maelstrom (1916, Short) .... John Barclay
 Accusing Evidence (1916, Short)
 Panthea (1917) .... Police Agent
 John Bates' Secret (1917, Short) .... John Bates, a.k.a. Edward Stevenson
 John Osborne's Triumph (1917, Short) .... John Osborne
 Fear Not (1917) .... Allen Mornington
 The Kingdom of Love (1917) .... Buck, Dance Hall Owner
 Loyalty (1917) .... Randell
 Humility (1918) .... Stuart Hamilton
 Her Moment (1918) .... Mr. Johnson (credited as Murdock McQuarrie)
 Riders of the Purple Sage (1918) .... Tull
 Gambling in Souls (1919) .... Thomas Philborn
 When a Woman Strikes (1919)
 Jacques of the Silver North (1919) .... Jim Blake
 The Little Diplomat (1919) .... Raymond Brownleigh

1920s
 The Silver Horde (1920) .... Richard Jones
 Sure Fire (1921) .... Major Parker
 Cheated Hearts (1921) .... Ibrahim
 The Unfoldment (1922) .... Mayor of Avenue A
 The Hidden Woman (1922) .... Iron MacLoid
 If I Were Queen (1922) .... Duke of Wortz
 Canyon of the Fools (1923) .... Sproul
 Ashes of Vengeance (1923) .... Carlotte
 The Only Woman (1924) .... Yacht Captain
 A Gentleman Roughneck (1925)
 The High Hand (1926) .... Martin Shaler
 Going the Limit (1926) .... Simson Windsor
 Hair-Trigger Baxter (1926) .... Joe Craddock
 The Jazz Girl (1926) .... Henry Wade
 The Long Loop on the Pecos (1927)
 The Man from Hard Pan (1927) .... Henry Hardy
 Black Jack (1927) .... Holbrook
 The Apache Raider (1928) .... Don Felix Beinal
 .45 Calibre War (1929) .... Mark Blodgett
 The Love Parade (1929) .... First Radio Announcer (uncredited)

1930s
 Troopers Three (1930) .... Army Officer
 Captain of the Guard (1930) .... Pierre
 Pardon My Gun (1930) .... Rancher (uncredited)
 The Lottery Bride (1930) .... Captain Larsen (uncredited)
 Command Performance (1931) .... Blondel
 The Drums of Jeopardy (1931) .... Stephen (uncredited)
 Hell Bound (1931)
 Two Gun Man (1931) .... Rancher Markham
 Law of the Rio Grande (1931) .... Saloon Gambler (uncredited)
 Sundown Trail (1931) .... Executor of the Estate
 Arizona Terror (1931) .... Joe Moore
 Near the Trail's End (1931) .... Dan Cather
 Grief Street (1931) .... 2nd Theater Doorman (uncredited)
 Lariats and Sixshooters (1931) .... Townsman (uncredited)
 The Devil Plays (1931) .... Butler
 The Wide Open Spaces (1931, Short) .... Townsman at Wedding (as Murdock McQuarrie)
 Dr. Jekyll and Mr. Hyde (1931) .... Dissenting doctor in crowd (uncredited)
 One Man Law (1932) .... Ed Grimm (credited as Murdock McQuarrie)
 The Shadow of the Eagle (1932, Serial) .... Frank - Watchman (uncredited)
 Forty-Five Calibre Echo (1932) .... Old man in saloon (uncredited)
 Cross-Examination (1932) .... Court Officer (uncredited)
 Texas Cyclone (1932) .... Courtroom Spectator (uncredited)
 The Saddle Buster (1932) .... Doc (uncredited)
 Border Devils (1932) .... Townsman (uncredited)
 Rule 'Em and Weep (1932, Short)
 Daring Danger (1932) .... 'Pa' Norris
 Ride Him, Cowboy (1932) .... Doctor attending Webb (uncredited)
 Fighting for Justice (1932) .... Sheriff (uncredited)
 Two Lips and Juleps; or, Southern Love and Northern Exposure (1932, Short)
 Wild Girl (1932) .... Jess Larabee (uncredited)
 The Gambling Sex (1932) .... Thompson
 The Penal Code (1932) .... Lefty
 Phantom Thunderbolt (1933) .... Townsman (uncredited)
 Son of the Border (1933) .... Townsman (uncredited)
 The Lone Avenger (1933) .... Townsman (uncredited)
 Cross Fire (1933) .... Sheriff Jim Wells
 Easy Millions (1933)
 Stolen by Gypsies or Beer and Bicycles (1933, Short) .... Sheriff
 One Year Later (1933) .... Well-Wisher at Train Station (uncredited)
 Girl Trouble (1933) .... Townsman (uncredited)
 Roman Scandals (1933) .... Senator Fool (uncredited)
 Potluck Pards (1934, Short) .... 'Pop' Hennessey
 The House of Rothschild (1934) .... Man at Stock Exchange (uncredited)
 Romance Revier (1934, Short) .... Banker William Carter
 Randy Rides Alone (1934) .... Murder victim (uncredited)
 Smoking Guns (1934) .... Townsman (uncredited)
 Going Bye-Bye! (1934, Short) .... Jury Foreman
 Fighting Hero (1934) .... Prosecutor
 The Tonto Kid (1934) .... 'Pop' Slawson (as Murdock McQuarrie)
 The Man from Hell (1934) .... Sheriff Jake Klein
 The Dude Ranger (1934) .... Doc Welsh (uncredited)
 The Return of Chandu (1934, Serial) .... The "Voice" of Ubasti [Chs. 4-12]
 Terror of the Plains (1934) .... Foreman Cole (as Murdock McQuarrie)
 When Lightning Strikes (1934) .... Jim Caldwell
 The Mighty Barnum (1934) .... Husband at Table (uncredited)
 Clive of India (1935) .... Sneering Man (uncredited)
 North of Arizona (1935) .... Marshal Herron
 Outlaw Rule (1935) .... Coroner Williamson (uncredited)
 Les Misérables (1935) .... Fauchelevant (uncredited)
 Stone of Silver Creek (1935) .... George J. Mason
 Bride of Frankenstein (1935) .... Sympathetic villager (uncredited)
 Gun Smoke (1935) .... Card Player (uncredited)
 Silent Valley (1935) .... Elmer Barnes (rancher)
 The Laramie Kid (1935) .... Dad Bland
 Outlawed Guns (1935) .... Banker Honeycutt (uncredited)
 Bonnie Scotland (1935) .... Recruiting Clerk (uncredited)
 Diamond Jim (1935) .... Stockbroker (uncredited)
 The Dark Angel (1935) .... Waiter at Inn (uncredited)
 The New Frontier (1935) .... Tom Lewis
 Nevada (1935) .... Watson (uncredited)
 Lawless Riders (1935) .... Townsman (uncredited)
 The Shadow of Silk Lennox (1935) .... Haskell, Silk's Lawyer (uncredited)
 Sunset of Power (1935) .... Doctor
 I'll Name the Murderer (1936) .... Wreck Witness (uncredited)
 Modern Times (1936) .... J. Widdecombe Billows (as Murdoch McQuarrie)
 The Prisoner of Shark Island (1936) .... Edman Spangler (uncredited)
 The Drag-Net (1936) - Hot-Check Gambler (uncredited)
 Pinto Rustlers (1936) .... Ed Walton
 The Lonely Trail (1936) .... Rancher (uncredited)
 Fury (1936) .... Dawson's friend (uncredited)
 Winds of the Wasteland (1936) .... Townsman (uncredited)
 Shakedown (1936) .... Attendant (uncredited)
 Prison Shadows (1936) .... Fight fan (uncredited)
 The Idaho Kid (1936) .... Townsman (uncredited)
 Santa Fe Bound (1936) .... Dad Bates (uncredited)
 Oh, Susanna! (1936) .... Sage City Townsman (uncredited)
 Ride 'Em Cowboy (1936) .... Race Spectator (uncredited)
 Cavalry (1936) .... Townsman (uncredited)
 Song of the Gringo (1936) .... Townsman (uncredited)
 Roarin' Lead (1936) .... Sims (uncredited)
 The Old Corral (1936) .... Townsman (uncredited)
 Stormy Trails (1936) .... Sheriff
 Great Guy (1936) .... Mr. Marvin (a client) (uncredited)
 Hittin' the Trail (1937) .... Townsman (uncredited)
 Venus Makes Trouble (1937) .... Sour-faced Man (uncredited)
 Back to the Woods (1937) .... Judge (uncredited)
 Pick a Star (1937) .... Jefferson Watts - Undertaker (uncredited)
 The Fighting Texan (1937) .... Jim Perkins
 Flying Fists (1937) .... Health Camp Man (uncredited)
 Slaves in Bondage (1937) .... Gambler (uncredited)
 On Such a Night (1937) .... Vasalia Juror (uncredited)
 Stars Over Arizona (1937) .... Townsman (uncredited)
 Zorro Rides Again (1937, Serial) .... Jones (night watchman) [Ch. 10] (uncredited)
 The Jury's Secret (1938) .... Flood Victim (uncredited)
 The Purple Vigilantes (1938) .... Juror (uncredited)
 The Lone Ranger (1938, Serial) .... Matt Clark [Ch. 6] (uncredited)
 Cattle Raiders (1938) .... Juror (uncredited)
 Frontier Town (1938) .... Townsman (uncredited)
 Topa Topa (1938) .... Hunter (uncredited)
 Outlaws of Sonora (1938) .... Barfly (uncredited)
 Western Trails (1938) (uncredited) .... Williams - Station Master (uncredited)
 Blockade (1938) .... Seaman (uncredited)
 Guilty Trails (1938) .... Judge Howard
 Prairie Justice (1938) .... Stage Line Agent (uncredited)
 Santa Fe Stampede (1938) .... Townsman (uncredited)
 Ghost Town Riders (1938) .... Tax Collector Harry Branson
 Tom Sawyer, Detective (1938) .... Posse Member (uncredited)
 Stand Up and Fight (1939) .... Engineer (uncredited)
 Disbarred (1939) .... First Jury Foreman (uncredited)
 Honor of the West (1939) .... Hank (as Murdock McQuarrie)
 The Phantom Stage (1939) .... John Scott -Stage Agent
 Arizona Legion (1939) .... Party Guest (uncredited)
 Smoky Trails (1939) .... Will Archer
 Wolf Call (1939) .... Miner (uncredited)
 They All Come Out (1939) .... Watchman (uncredited)
 Colorado Sunset (1939) .... Dairyman Jones (uncredited)
 Mutiny on the Blackhawk (1939)  .... Bill, a Settler (uncredited)
 Konga, the Wild Stallion (1939) .... Clerk (uncredited)
 At the Circus (1939) .... Attendant (uncredited)
 Tower of London (1939) .... Councilman (uncredited)
 Cowboys from Texas (1939) .... Congressman (uncredited)
 Death Rides the Range (1939) .... Sheriff (uncredited)

1940s
 The Shadow (1940, Serial) .... Richards, Rand's Butler [Chs. 2-3] (uncredited)
 The House of the Seven Gables (1940) .... Town Gossip (uncredited)
 The Showdown (1940) .... Zeke (uncredited)
 An Angel from Texas (1940) .... Lone Star Townsman (uncredited)
 Pinto Canyon (1940) .... Rancher Barnes
 Those Were the Days! (1940) .... First Citizen (uncredited)
 The Captain Is a Lady (1940) .... Seaman (uncredited)
 Boys of the City (1940) .... Man on Sidewalk Watching Fight (uncredited)
 Deadwood Dick (1940, Serial) .... Jasper Kenyon [Chs. 11-13] (uncredited)
 Brigham Young (1940) .... Minor Role (uncredited)
 The Mummy's Hand (1940) .... Temple Priest (uncredited)
 Frontier Vengeance (1940) .... Townsman (uncredited)
 The Wildcat of Tucson (1940) .... Doctor (uncredited)
 Federal Fugitives (1941) .... Night Watchman (uncredited)
 The Return of Daniel Boone (1941) .... Telegrapher (uncredited)
 Paper Bullets (1941) .... 1st Bailiff (uncredited)
 They Meet Again (1941) .... Juror (uncredited)
 Arizona Bound (1941) .... Zeke (uncredited)
 The Richest Man in Town (1941) .... Postman (uncredited)
 Man from Montana (1941) .... Joel Preston
 Freckles Comes Home (1942) .... Bus Passenger / Indiana Townsman (uncredited)
 Woman of the Year (1942) .... Head Copy Reader (uncredited)
 Ghost Town Law (1942) .... Judge Crail
 The Corpse Vanishes (1942) .... The Minister (uncredited)
 Tombstone, the Town Too Tough to Die (1942) .... Townsman (uncredited)
 Jackass Mail (1942) .... Hickory Jake (uncredited)
 Timber (1942) .... Old Timer (uncredited)
 The Omaha Trail (1942) .... Oxen Owner (uncredited)
 Cat People (1942) .... Sheep caretaker (uncredited)
 Arabian Nights (1942) .... Bidder (uncredited)
 Dr. Terror's House of Horrors (1943) .... The High Priest (segment "The Panther Men of Zuma") (archive footage)
 Wolves of the Range (1943) .... Stock footage townsman (uncredited)
 Silver City Raiders (1943) .... Townsman (uncredited)

Director

 The Old Cobbler (1914)
 The Old Bell-Ringer (1914)
 The Nihilists (1914)
 The Wall of Flame (1914)
 The Star Gazer (1914)
 Two Thieves (1914)
 As We Journey Through Life (1914)
 The Christmas Spirit (1914)
 For I Have Toiled (1914)
 When It's One of Your Own (1914)
 His Last Performance (1915)
 The Clutch of the Emperor (1915)
 The Useless One (1915)
 The Dear Old Hypocrite (1915)
 Alias Mr. Smith (1915)
 Seven and Seventy (1915)
 The Prayer of a Horse or: His Life Story Told by Himself (1915)
 Wheels Within Wheels (1915)
 The Truth About Dan Deering (1915)
 The Old Tutor (1915)
 The Troubadour (1915)
 Where Brains Are Needed (1915)
 The Old Doctor (1915)
 The Swinging Doors (1915)
 The Tinker of Stubbenville (1915)
 The Old Grouch (1915)
 The Closing Chapter (1915)
 Mein Friendt Schneider (1915) (credited as Murdock McQuarrie)
 His Beloved Violin (1915)
 Ethel's Burglar (1915)
 The Mystery of the Tapestry Room (1915)
 The Finest Gold (1915)
 The Tam o' Shanter (1915)
 The Sheriff of Red Rock Gulch (1915)
 The $50,000 Jewel Theft (1915)
 The Flag of Fortune (1915)
 The Trap That Failed (1915)
 The Sacrifice of Jonathan Gray (1915)
 Colonel Steel, Master Gambler (1915)
 Babbling Tongues (1915)
 In the Web of the Grafters (1916)
 The Fatal Introduction (1916)
 On Dangerous Ground (1916)
 The Stain in the Blood (1916)
 Nancy's Birthright (1916)
 The Sign of the Spade (1916)
 Sandy, Reformer (1916) (completed film)
 El Diablo (1916)
 The Gambler's Lost Love (1916)
 John Osborne's Triumph (1917)
 Thunderbolt Jack (1920)
 The Unfoldment (1922)

Writer
 The Hopes of Blind Alley (1914) (story)
 Ethel's Burglar (1915) (scenario)
 The $50,000 Jewel Theft (1915)
 Life's Maelstrom (1916) (scenario)

References

External links

 

1878 births
1942 deaths
Film directors from California
Male actors from California
American male silent film actors
20th-century American male actors